The Aguja Saint Exupery is a mountain spear ('aguja') located near the Cerro Chaltén in the Los Glaciares National Park in Patagonia, Argentina.

The mountain is named in memory of Antoine de Saint Exupéry, the French writer and aviator who was director of the Aeroposta Argentina airline and pioneered postal flights in the Patagonia region between 1929 and 1931.

The Aguja Saint Exupery is not as impressive as its taller neighbors Cerro Chaltén and the striking Cerro Torre, but due to the length of its climbing routes and the extreme weather conditions of the southern Andes, it shares the same big wall reputation as most Patagonian peaks. The Aguja Saint Exupery was first climbed on February 23, 1968, by Silvia Metzeltin, Gino Buscaini, Lino Condot, Walter Romano & Silvano Sinigoi, an Italian team of climbers who opened an  route on its East Pillar.

Dead mountaineers

 Bryn Carlyle Norman, a Canadian in January 2012.

References

Kearney, Alan, 1993. Mountaineering in Patagonia.  Seattle USA: Cloudcap.

External links
Aguja Saint Exupery at SummitPost Climbing Site
Aguja Saint Exupery at Climb and More

Expe Climbing Site (French)
Climbing Site (Spanish)

Mountains of Argentina
Landforms of Santa Cruz Province, Argentina
Antoine de Saint-Exupéry